Carrigafoyle may refer to:

 Carrigafoyle, Wellington
 Siege of Carrigafoyle Castle